

See also

 Flight Patterns
 Performing Frogs

Culture of Eugene, Oregon
Eugene
 
Eugene